"Read My Lips" is a song written by Marc Blatte and Larry Gottlieb, and first recorded by American country music artist Dottie West on her 1983 album New Horizons.  

The song was later recorded by American country music artist Marie Osmond and released in March 1986 as the second single from her album There's No Stopping Your Heart.  The song reached number 4 on the Billboard Hot Country Singles & Tracks chart.

References

1986 singles
1983 songs
Dottie West songs
Marie Osmond songs
Song recordings produced by Paul Worley
Capitol Records Nashville singles
Curb Records singles
Songs written by Larry Gottlieb